Club Deportivo Salvadoreño are a Salvadoran professional football club based in Armenia, El Salvador.

The club currently plays in the Third Division.

History
The club was formed in 1917 by a group of citizens from Armenia, being first named as ATLACATL, before changing their name to Sandino”, ein on honor of Nicaraguan rebel Augusto César Sandino. After minimal success and the fact the club wanted to represent the region better.
On May 1924, C.D. Sandino renamed and rebranded themselves as Club Deportivo Salvadoreño.

Stadium
 Estadio 21 de Noviembre  (1956–Present'')
 Cancha de Ferrocarril (1917-1959) games played in this location, before moving to Cancha Lícida
 Cancha de Lícida (1960–00) Salvadoreno home ground before moving to the TBD.

Salvadoreno plays its home games at Estadio 21 de Noviembre  located in San Miguel, The stadium has a capacity of 10,000 people.

Notable players
 Edgar Henríquez (1984)
 Salvador Edmundo Portillo Preza

Coaches
 CRISTO ARNOLDO VELÁSQUEZ (2033-2005)
 Jorge Búcaro (2005-2006)

References

External links
 El Salvadoreño de Armenia favorito llevarse la corona , La cosa esta buena - elsalvadorterceradivisiondefutbol 

Association football clubs established in 1924
Football clubs in El Salvador